Cannons Creek is a suburb of Porirua City approximately 22km north of Wellington in New Zealand.

Demographics

Cannons Creek had a population of 8,973 at the 2018 New Zealand census, an increase of 753 people (9.2%) since the 2013 census, and an increase of 369 people (4.3%) since the 2006 census. There were 2,262 households. There were 4,383 males and 4,593 females, giving a sex ratio of 0.95 males per female, with 2,589 people (28.9%) aged under 15 years, 2,313 (25.8%) aged 15 to 29, 3,375 (37.6%) aged 30 to 64, and 696 (7.8%) aged 65 or older.

Ethnicities were 24.3% European/Pākehā, 26.6% Māori, 62.7% Pacific peoples, 8.6% Asian, and 3.1% other ethnicities (totals add to more than 100% since people could identify with multiple ethnicities).

The proportion of people born overseas was 30.6%, compared with 27.1% nationally.

Although some people objected to giving their religion, 26.3% had no religion, 58.6% were Christian, 0.8% were Hindu, 2.9% were Muslim, 1.6% were Buddhist and 2.7% had other religions.

Of those at least 15 years old, 498 (7.8%) people had a bachelor or higher degree, and 1,653 (25.9%) people had no formal qualifications. The employment status of those at least 15 was that 2,640 (41.4%) people were employed full-time, 840 (13.2%) were part-time, and 642 (10.1%) were unemployed.

Education

Primary schools

Cannons Creek has four co-educational state contributing primary schools for Year 1 to 6 students:

 Cannons Creek School, with a roll of 

Intermediate school

Secondary schools

It was founded in 1968.

References

External links 
Cannons Creek East Community Profile at  Statistics NZ
Cannons Creek North Community Profile at Statistics NZ
Cannons Creek South Community Profile at Statistics NZ

Suburbs of Porirua